The Army Special Forces Command regroups the various special operations forces units of the French Army and is the command charged with overseeing them. It is based in Pau, Pyrénées-Atlantiques.

History 
The COM FST is the heir of the Independent Special Grouping created in 1997 and then commanded the 1er RPIMa and a special operations flight belonging to the 4th command and manoeuvre helicopters regiment of the ALAT.

The  (BFST) was activated on 1 July 2002 and included the 13e RDP. The BFST conduct an annual exercise called Gorgones (gorgons) to ensure interoperability of the three units. The name Gorgones refers to the three units, as the three mythological figures.

The BFST has supported the peacekeeping operation in Côte d'Ivoire (Opération Licorne) and Afghanistan (Mission Héraclès).

Structure 
 Army Special Forces Command, in Pau
 Special Forces Command and Signals Company, in Pau
 1st Marine Infantry Paratroopers Regiment, in Bayonne (_
 13th Paratrooper Dragoons Regiment, in Martignas-sur-Jalle
 4th Special Forces Helicopter Regiment, in Pau
 Special Operations Support Group, in Pau
 Special Forces Academy, in Pau

See also 
List of French paratrooper units

External links
ShadowSpear Special Operations Community Website

Special forces of France
Brigades of France
Military units and formations established in 2002
Military units and formations disestablished in 2016
Military units and formations established in 2016